Sirakov may refer to 
Širákov, a village and municipality in southern Slovakia
Sirákov, a village and municipality in the Czech Republic
Sirakov (surname)